Adele Laurie Blue Adkins  (born 5 May 1988) is an English singer and songwriter.  After graduating in arts from the BRIT School in 2006, Adele signed a record deal with XL Recordings. Her debut album, 19, was released in 2008 and spawned the UK top-five singles "Chasing Pavements" and "Make You Feel My Love". 19 has sold over 2.5 million copies in the UK and was named in the top 20 best-selling debut albums of all time in the UK. Adele was honoured with the Brit Award for Rising Star as well as the Grammy Award for Best New Artist.

Adele released her second studio album, 21, in 2011. It became the world's best-selling album of the 21st century, with sales of over 31 million copies. It was certified 18x platinum in the UK (the highest by a solo artist of all time) and Diamond in the US. According to Billboard, 21 is the top-performing album in the US chart history, topping the Billboard 200 for 24 weeks (the longest for a female artist ever). She was the first female artist in the history of the Billboard Hot 100 to have three simultaneous top-ten singles as a lead artist, with "Rolling in the Deep", "Someone Like You", and "Set Fire to the Rain", all of which also topped the chart. The album received a record-tying six Grammy Awards, including Album of the Year, and the Brit Award for British Album of the Year. The success of 21 earned Adele numerous mentions in the Guinness Book of Records. Rolling Stone magazine placed her album 21 in their listing of 500 Greatest Albums of All Time (2020).

In 2012, Adele released "Skyfall", a soundtrack single for the James Bond film of the same name, which won the Academy Award and the Golden Globe Award for Best Original Song. Her third studio album, 25, was released in 2015 and became the year's best-selling album, also breaking first-week sales records in the UK and US, where it is the only album to sell over three million copies in a week. 25 was her second album to be certified Diamond in the US and earned her five Grammy Awards, including Album of the Year, and four Brit Awards, including British Album of the Year. The lead single, "Hello", became the first song in the US to sell over one million digital copies within a week of its release. Her fourth studio album 30, which contains the chart-topping single "Easy on Me", was released in 2021 and became the year's best-selling album worldwide including US and UK. 30 won the Brit Award for British Album of the Year, while "Easy on Me" won the Brit Award for Song of the Year and the Grammy Award for Best Pop Solo Performance.

Adele is one of the best-selling music artists, with sales of over 100 million records worldwide. She was named as the best-selling artist of the 2010s decade in the US and worldwide as well as best-selling female artist of the 21st century in the UK. Her accolades include sixteen Grammy Awards, twelve Brit Awards, an Academy Award, a Golden Globe Award and a Primetime Emmy Award. In 2011, 2012, and 2016, Billboard named her Artist of the Year. At the 2012 and 2016 Ivor Novello Awards, Adele was named Songwriter of the Year by The Ivors Academy. Time magazine named her one of the most influential people in the world in 2012, 2016, and 2022. She was appointed a MBE at the 2013 Queen's Birthday Honours for services to music. Rolling Stone ranked her 22nd in their list of 200 Greatest Singers of all time (2023), whereas The Times named her the second best singer of the 21st century.

Early life and education
Adele Laurie Blue Adkins was born on 5 May 1988 in the Tottenham district of London, to an English mother, Penny Adkins, and a Welsh father, Marc Evans. Evans left when Adele was 2, and she was brought up by her mother. She began singing at age 4 and asserts that she became obsessed with voices. In 1997, 9-year-old Adele and her mother, who by then had found work as a furniture maker and an adult-learning activities organiser, relocated to Brighton on the south coast of England.

In 1999, she and her mother moved back to London; first to Brixton, then to the neighbouring district of West Norwood in south London, which is the subject of her first song "Hometown Glory". She spent much of her youth in Brockwell Park where she would play the guitar and sing to friends, which she recalled in her 2015 song "Million Years Ago". She stated, "It has quite monumental moments of my life that I've spent there, and I drove past it [in 2015] and I just literally burst into tears. I really missed it." Adele graduated from the BRIT School for Performing Arts & Technology in Croydon in May 2006, where she was a classmate of Leona Lewis and Jessie J. Adele credits the school with nurturing her talent even though, at the time, she was more interested in going into artists and repertoire (A&R) and hoped to launch other people's careers.

Career

2006–2010: Career beginnings and 19

Four months after graduation, Adele published two songs on the fourth issue of the online arts publication PlatformsMagazine.com. She had recorded a three-song demo for a class project and given it to a friend. The friend posted the demo on Myspace, where it became very successful and led to a phone call from Richard Russell, boss of the music label XL Recordings. She doubted if the offer was real because the only record company she knew was Virgin Records, and she took a friend with her to the meeting. Around this time, Adele collaborated with Ricsta on "Be Divine", a song described as an "electronic club-ready" track.

Nick Huggett, at XL, recommended Adele to manager Jonathan Dickins at September Management, and in June 2006, Dickins became her official representative. September was managing Jamie T at the time and this proved a major draw for Adele, a big fan of the British singer-songwriter. Huggett then signed Adele to XL in September 2006. Adele provided vocals for Jack Peñate's song, "My Yvonne," for his debut album, and it was during this session she first met producer Jim Abbiss, who would go on to produce both the majority of her debut album, 19, and tracks on 21. In June 2007, Adele made her television debut, performing "Daydreamer" on the BBC's Later... with Jools Holland. Adele's breakthrough song, "Hometown Glory", written when she was 16, was released in October 2007.

By 2008, Adele had become the headliner and performed an acoustic set, in which she was supported by Damien Rice. She became the first recipient of the Brit Awards Critics' Choice and was named the number-one predicted breakthrough act of 2008 in an annual BBC poll of music critics, Sound of 2008. She released her second single, "Chasing Pavements", on 14 January 2008, two weeks ahead of her debut album. The song reached number two on the UK Chart, and stayed there for four weeks. The album 19, named for her age at the time she wrote and composed many of its songs, entered the British charts at number one. The Times Encyclopedia of Modern Music named 19 an "essential" blue-eyed soul recording. Adele was nominated for a 2008 Mercury Prize award for 19. She also won an Urban Music Award for "Best Jazz Act," and a Music of Black Origin (MOBO) nomination in the category of Best UK Female. In March 2008, Adele signed a deal with Columbia Records and XL Recordings for her foray into the United States. She embarked on a short North American tour in the same month, and 19 was released in the US in June. Billboard magazine stated of it: "Adele truly has potential to become among the most respected and inspiring international artists of her generation." The An Evening with Adele world tour began in May 2008 and ended in June 2009.

She later cancelled the 2008 US tour dates to be with a former boyfriend. She said in Nylon magazine in June 2009, "I'm like, 'I can't believe I did that.' It seems so ungrateful.... I was drinking far too much and that was kind of the basis of my relationship with this boy. I couldn't bear to be without him, so I was like, 'Well, I'll just cancel my stuff then.'" She referred to this period as her "early life crisis". She is also known for her dislike of flying and bouts of homesickness when away from her native London. By the middle of October 2008, Adele's attempt to break in America appeared to have failed. But then she was booked as the musical guest on 18 October 2008 episode of NBC's Saturday Night Live. The episode, which included an expected appearance by then US vice-presidential candidate Sarah Palin, earned the program its best ratings in 14 years with 17 million viewers. Adele performed "Chasing Pavements" and "Cold Shoulder," and the following day, 19 topped the iTunes charts and ranked at number five at Amazon.com while "Chasing Pavements" rose into the top 25. The album reached number 11 on the Billboard 200 as a result, a jump of 35 places over the previous week.
In November 2008, Adele moved to Notting Hill, London after leaving her mother's house, a move that prompted her to give up drinking. The album was certified gold in early 2009, by the RIAA. By July 2009, the album had sold 2.2 million copies worldwide.

At the 51st Annual Grammy Awards in February 2009, Adele won the award for Best New Artist, in addition to the award for Best Female Pop Vocal Performance for "Chasing Pavements", which was also nominated for Record of the Year and Song of the Year. Adele performed "Chasing Pavements" at the ceremony in a duet with Jennifer Nettles. In 2010, Adele received a Grammy nomination for Best Female Pop Vocal Performance for "Hometown Glory." In April her song "My Same" entered the German Singles Chart after it had been performed by Lena Meyer-Landrut in the talent show contest Unser Star für Oslo, or Our Star for Oslo, in which the German entry to the Eurovision Song Contest 2010 was determined. In late September, after being featured on The X Factor, Adele's version of Bob Dylan's "Make You Feel My Love" re-entered the UK singles chart at number 4. During the 2010 CMT Artists of the Year special, Adele performed a widely publicised duet of Lady Antebellum's "Need You Now" with Darius Rucker. This performance was later nominated for a CMT Music Award.

2011–2014: 21, worldwide recognition and hiatus

Adele released her second studio album, 21, on 24 January 2011 in the UK and 22 February in the US. She said the album was inspired by the breakup with her former partner. The album's sound is described as classic and contemporary country and roots music. The change in sound from her debut album was the result of her bus driver playing contemporary music from Nashville when she was touring the American South, and the title reflected the growth she had experienced in the prior two years. Adele told Spin Magazine: "It was really exciting for me because I never grew up around [that music]." 21 topped the charts in 30 countries, including the UK and the US.

In a 2011 Rolling Stone cover story, Adele said she dealt with onstage anxiety by creating the alter ego "Sasha Carter", derived from Beyoncé's "Sasha Fierce" and June Carter. During one episode after she met Beyoncé, Adele said, she asked "What would Sasha Fierce do?" and that helped.

An emotional performance of "Someone Like You" at the 31st Brit Awards on 15 February propelled the song to number one in the UK. Her first album, 19, re-entered the UK album chart alongside 21, while first and second singles "Rolling in the Deep" and "Someone Like You" were in the top 5 of the UK singles chart, making Adele the first living artist to achieve the feat of two top-five hits in both the Official Singles Chart and the Official Albums Chart simultaneously since the Beatles in 1964. Both songs topped the charts in multiple markets and broke numerous sales performance records. Following her performance of "Someone Like You" at the 2011 MTV Video Music Awards, it became Adele's second number-one single on the Billboard Hot 100. By December 2011, 21 sold over 3.4 million copies in the UK, and became the biggest-selling album of the 21st century, overtaking Amy Winehouse's Back to Black, with Adele becoming the first artist ever to sell three million albums in the UK in one calendar year. "Set Fire to the Rain" became Adele's third number-one single on the Billboard Hot 100, as Adele became the first artist ever to have an album, 21, hold the number-one position on the Billboard 200 concurrently with three number-one singles. Moreover, 21 had the most weeks on the Billboard 200 chart of any album by a female artist.

To promote the album, Adele embarked upon the "Adele Live" tour, which sold out its North American leg. In October 2011, Adele was forced to cancel two tours because of a vocal-cord haemorrhage. She released a statement saying she needed an extended period of rest to avoid permanent damage to her voice. In the first week of November 2011 Steven M. Zeitels, director of the Center for Laryngeal Surgery and Voice Rehabilitation at the Massachusetts General Hospital in Boston, performed laser microsurgery on Adele's vocal cords to remove a benign polyp. A recording of her tour, Live at the Royal Albert Hall, was released in November 2011, debuting at number one in the US with 96,000 copies sold, the highest one-week tally for a music DVD in four years, becoming the best-selling music DVD of 2011. Adele is the first artist in Nielsen SoundScan history to have the year's number-one album (21), number-one single ("Rolling in the Deep"), and number-one music video (Live at the Royal Albert Hall). At the 2011 American Music Awards on 20 November, Adele won three awards; Favorite Pop/Rock Female Artist, Favorite Adult Contemporary Artist, and Favorite Pop/Rock Album for 21. On 9 December, Billboard named Adele Artist of the Year, Billboard 200 Album of the Year (21), and the Billboard Hot 100 Song of the Year ("Rolling in the Deep"), becoming the first woman ever to top all three categories.

Following the throat microsurgery, she made her live comeback at the 2012 Grammy Awards in February. She won in all six categories for which she was nominated, including Album of the Year, Record of the Year, and Song of the Year, making her the second female artist in Grammy history, after Beyoncé, to win that many awards in a single night. Following that success, 21 achieved the biggest weekly sales increase following a Grammy win since Nielsen SoundScan began tracking data in 1991. Adele received the Brit Award for British Female Solo Artist, and British Album of the Year presented to her by George Michael. Following the Brit Awards, 21 reached number one for the 21st non-consecutive week in the UK. The album has sold over 4.5 million copies in the UK where it is the fourth-best-selling album. In October, the album's sales surpassed 4.5 million in the UK, and in November it surpassed 10 million sales in the US. The best-selling album worldwide of 2011 and 2012, the album has sold over 31 million copies. By the end of 2014, she had sold an estimated 40 million albums and 50 million singles worldwide. Adele is the only artist or band in the last decade in the US to earn an RIAA diamond certification for a one disc album in less than two years.

In October 2012, Adele confirmed that she had been writing, composing and recording the theme song for Skyfall, the twenty-third James Bond film. The song "Skyfall," written and composed in collaboration with producer Paul Epworth, was recorded at Abbey Road Studios, and features orchestrations by J. A. C. Redford. Adele stated recording "Skyfall" was "one of the proudest moments of my life." On 14 October, "Skyfall" rose to number 2 on the UK Singles Chart with sales of 92,000 copies bringing its overall sales to 176,000, and "Skyfall" entered the Billboard Hot 100 at number 8, selling 261,000 copies in the US in its first three days. This tied "Skyfall" with Duran Duran's "A View to a Kill" as the highest-charting James Bond theme song on the UK Singles Chart; a record surpassed in 2015 by Sam Smith's "Writing's on the Wall".

"Skyfall" has sold more than five million copies worldwide and earned Adele the Golden Globe Award for Best Original Song and the Academy Award for Best Original Song. In December 2012, Adele was named Billboard Artist of the Year, and 21 was named Album of the Year, making her the first artist to receive both accolades two years in a row. Adele was also named top female artist. The Associated Press named Adele Entertainer of the Year for 2012. The 2013 Grammy Awards saw Adele's live version of "Set Fire to the Rain" win the Grammy Award for Best Pop Solo Performance, bringing her total wins to nine.

On 3 April 2012, Adele confirmed that her third album would likely be at least two years away, stating, "I have to take time and live a little bit. There were a good two years between my first and second albums, so it'll be the same this time." She stated that she would continue writing and composing her own material. At the 2013 Grammy Awards, she confirmed that she was in the very early stages of her third album. She also stated that she will most likely work with Paul Epworth again.

In September 2013, Wiz Khalifa confirmed that he and Adele had collaborated on a song for his fifth studio album, Blacc Hollywood, though the collaboration did not make the final track listing. In January 2014, Adele received her tenth Grammy Award with "Skyfall" winning Best Song Written for Visual Media at the 56th Annual Grammy Awards.

2015–2017: 25 and Adele Live 2016
On the eve of her 26th birthday in May 2014, Adele posted a cryptic message via her Twitter account which prompted media discussion about her next album. The message, "Bye bye 25... See you again later in the year," was interpreted by some in the media, including Capital FM, as meaning that her next album would be titled 25 and released later in the year. In 2014, Adele was nominated for nine World Music Awards. In early August, Paul Moss suggested that an album would be released in 2014 or 2015. However, in the October 2014 accounts filed with Companies House by XL Recordings, they ruled out a 2014 release.

 On 27 August 2015, Billboard reported that Adele's label, XL Recordings, had intentions of releasing her third studio album sometime in November 2015. Danger Mouse was revealed to have contributed a song, while Tobias Jesso Jr. had written a track, and Ryan Tedder was "back in the mix after producing and co-writing 'Rumour Has It' on 21." At the 72nd Venice International Film Festival in early September 2015, Sia announced that her new single "Alive" was co-written by Adele, and had originally been intended for Adele's third album. On 18 October, a 30-second clip of new material from Adele was shown on UK television during a commercial break on The X Factor. The commercial teases a snippet from a new song from her third album, with viewers hearing a voice singing accompanied by lyrics on a black screen.

In a statement released three days later, Adele confirmed the album's title to be 25, with her stating, "My last record was a break-up record, and if I had to label this one, I would call it a make-up record. Making up for lost time. Making up for everything I ever did and never did. 25 is about getting to know who I've become without realising. And I'm sorry it took so long but, you know, life happened." At the time, Adele said 25 would be her last album titled after her age, believing it would be the end to a trilogy. On 22 October, Adele confirmed that 25 would be released on 20 November, while the lead single from the album, "Hello" would be released on 23 October. The song was first played on Nick Grimshaw's Radio 1 Breakfast Show on the BBC on the morning of 23 October with Adele interviewed live.

The video of "Hello", released on 22 October, was viewed over 27.7 million times on YouTube in its first 24 hours, breaking the Vevo record for the most views in a day, surpassing the 20.1 million views for "Bad Blood" by Taylor Swift. On 28 October, BBC News reported that "Hello" was being viewed on YouTube an average one million times an hour. "Hello" went on to become the fastest video to hit one billion views on YouTube, which it achieved after 88 days. The video for "Hello" captured iconic British elements such as a red telephone box and a cup of tea. The song debuted at number one on the UK Singles Chart on 30 October, with first week sales of 330,000 copies, making it the biggest-selling number one single in three years. "Hello" also debuted at number one in many countries around the world, including Australia, France, Canada, New Zealand, Ireland and Germany, and on 2 November, the song debuted at number one on the Billboard Hot 100, becoming the first song in the US to sell at least one million downloads in a week, setting the record at 1.11 million. By the end of 2015, it had sold 12.3 million units globally and was the year's 7th-best-selling single despite being released in late October.

On 27 October, BBC One announced plans for Adele at the BBC, a one-hour special presented by Graham Norton, in which Adele talks about her new album and performs new songs. This was her first television appearance since performing at the 2013 Academy Awards ceremony, and the show was recorded before a live audience on 2 November for broadcast on 20 November, coinciding with the release of 25. On 27 October it was also announced that Adele would appear on the US entertainment series Saturday Night Live on 21 November. On 30 October, Adele confirmed that she would be performing a one-night-only concert titled Adele Live in New York City at the Radio City Music Hall on 17 November. Subsequently, NBC aired the concert special on 14 December.

On 27 November, 25 debuted at number one on the UK Albums Chart and became the fastest selling album in UK chart history with over 800,000 copies sold in its first week. The album debuted at number one in the US where it sold a record-breaking 3.38 million copies in its first week, the largest single sales week for an album since Nielsen began monitoring sales in 1991. 25 also broke first week sales records in Canada and New Zealand. 25 became the best-selling album of 2015 in a number of countries, including Australia, the UK and the US, spending seven consecutive weeks at number one in each country, before being displaced by David Bowie's Blackstar. It was the best-selling album worldwide of 2015 with 17.4 million copies sold. 25 has since sold 20 million copies globally. Adele's seven weeks at the top of the UK Albums Chart took her total to 31 weeks at number one in the UK with her three albums, surpassing Madonna's previous record of most weeks at number one for a female act. As the best-selling artist worldwide for 2015 the IFPI named Adele the Global Recording Artist of the Year.

In November 2015, Adele's 2016 tour was announced, her first tour since 2011. Beginning in Europe, Adele Live 2016 included four dates at the Manchester Arena in March 2016, six dates at the O2 Arena, London, with further dates in Ireland, Spain, Germany, Italy and the Netherlands among others. Her North American Tour began on 5 July in St. Paul, Minnesota. The leg included six nights at Madison Square Garden in New York City, eight nights at Staples Center in Los Angeles, and four nights at Air Canada Centre in Toronto. Adele broke Taylor Swift's five-show record for most consecutive sold-out shows at the Staples Center.

At the 36th Brit Awards in London on 24 February, Adele received the awards for British Female Solo Artist, British Album of the Year for 25, British Single of the Year for "Hello", and British Global Success, bringing her Brit Award wins to eight. She closed the ceremony by performing "When We Were Young", the second single from 25. Two more singles from 25 were released in 2016: "Send My Love (To Your New Lover)" and "Water Under the Bridge". While on stage at London's O2 Arena on 17 March, Adele announced that she would be headlining on the Pyramid Stage at the 2016 Glastonbury Festival, which was later confirmed by the festival's organisers. She appeared for a 90-minute fifteen song set at the festival on 25 June in front of 150,000 people, and described the experience as "by far, the best moment of my life so far". In an interview with Jo Whiley on BBC Radio 2 around 30-minutes before going on stage, Adele had said she had been going to Glastonbury since she was a child and that the festival had meant a lot to her, before she broke down. Whiley recalls, "She was really scared, really, really scared. We were doing the interview and at one point she had to stop as she was in tears. It was amazing to see somebody like that, then to witness her walking out on stage and doing the most incredible set. To know that half an hour before she'd been in tears at the thought of walking out there."

In 2016, Vanity Fair magazine published a cover story which referred to Adele as the "Queen of Hearts".

As part of her world tour, in February and March 2017, Adele performed in Australia for the first time, playing outdoor stadiums around the country. Her first two shows in New Zealand sold out in a record-breaking 23 minutes, and a third show was announced, with all tickets sold in under 30 minutes. Adele sold over 600,000 tickets for her record-breaking eight date Australian tour, setting stadium records throughout the country; her Sydney show at ANZ Stadium on 10 March was seen by 95,000 people, the biggest single concert in Australian history, a record she broke the following night with more than 100,000 fans.
Adele completed her world tour with two concerts, dubbed "The Finale", at Wembley Stadium, London on 28 and 29 June. She announced the shows at "the home of football" by singing the England football team's "Three Lions" anthem and also the theme song to the BBC's weekly Premier League football show Match of the Day. Adele had added another two concerts at Wembley after the first two dates sold out, however she cancelled the last two dates of the tour after damaging her vocal cords. As a show of support, fans instead gathered outside Wembley Stadium to perform renditions of her songs, in an event titled "Sing for Adele".

At the end of 2016, Billboard named Adele Artist of the Year for the third time, and also received the Top Billboard 200 album. 25 was the best-selling album for a second consecutive year in the US. With 235 million views, Adele's Carpool Karaoke through the streets of London with James Corden, a sketch which featured on Corden's talk show The Late Late Show with James Corden in January 2016, was the biggest YouTube viral video of 2016. At the 59th Annual Grammy Awards in February 2017, Adele won all five of her nominations, bringing her number of awards to fifteen. She won Album of the Year and Best Pop Vocal Album for 25, and Record of the Year, Song of the Year and Best Pop Solo Performance for "Hello". She also performed a tribute to the late George Michael singing the rendition of his song "Fastlove"; due to technical difficulties which occurred during the performance, Adele decided to stop and restart, explaining "I can't mess this up for him". As announced on 31 July 2017, Adele switched performance rights management in the US from BMI to SESAC.

2018–present: 30 and Las Vegas residency 
Adele was reportedly working on her fourth studio album by 2018. On 5 May 2019, her 31st birthday, Adele posted several black-and-white pictures of herself on her Instagram account celebrating the occasion along with a message reflecting on the preceding year. The message ended with, "30 will be a drum n bass record to spite you". Media outlets took the post as an indication that a new album was on the way. On 15 February 2020, Adele announced at a friend's wedding that her fourth studio album would be out by September 2020. However, she later confirmed that the album's production and release had been delayed due to the COVID-19 pandemic. Adele made her first television appearance in almost four years by hosting the 24 October 2020 episode of Saturday Night Live, with musical guest H.E.R.

On 1 October 2021, projections and billboards of the number "30" appeared on significant landmarks and buildings in different cities around the world, fuelling speculation that Adele was responsible, and that 30 would be the title of her fourth album. Soon after, Adele's website and social media accounts matched the aesthetic of the projections and billboards, hinting that her new album would be titled 30, which was subsequently confirmed. On 5 October 2021, Adele announced her single "Easy on Me" for release on 15 October. A release date of 19 November 2021 was announced for the album shortly thereafter. On 7 October, Adele was announced to be the November cover star on both Vogue and British Vogue, the first person to simultaneously cover both publications at the same time. On 15 October, Adele released "Easy on Me" to a positive reception, breaking Spotify and Amazon Music records for most streams for a song in a day. The song debuted at number one on the UK Singles Chart, Adele's third UK number one, and had the highest first-week sales for a single since January 2017. Reaching the top of the Billboard Hot 100, it is her fifth US number-one single. On 28 October 2021, pre-sale tickets for her two concerts in Hyde Park, London, scheduled for 1 and 2 July 2022, sold out in less than an hour. The total number of tickets sold were 130,000, without prior promotion. More than 1,3 million people attempted to buy tickets for these two concerts. Jim King, CEO of the European Festivals division at AEG stated that Adele "could have sold several million tickets to the shows, such is the demand for her".

30 was released on 19 November 2021 and became a global success, reaching number one in 24 territories. In the UK, the album debuted at number one on the Official Albums Chart with 261,000 copies sold, garnering the largest opening week for an album since Ed Sheeran's Divide in 2017, and also has the highest first-week sales for an album by a female artist since Adele's own 25, becoming the best-selling album of 2021 in the country. In the US, it was Adele's third consecutive Billboard 200 number-one album and the year's best-seller as well. 30 was the best-selling album of 2021 worldwide, topping the Global Album All-Format Chart, Global Album Sales Chart, and the newly created Global Vinyl Album Chart. The album sold over 5.5 million pure copies within two months of its release. It was her first album to be marketed globally by Columbia Records instead of being split between XL Recordings and Beggars Group's regional distribution partners in most of the world and Columbia in North America. On 30 November 2021, Adele announced a Las Vegas residency titled Weekends with Adele at The Colosseum at Caesars Palace that would have run from 21 January 2022 until 16 April 2022.

On 20 January 2022, she announced the Las Vegas residency was postponed due to "delivery delays and COVID". On 8 February 2022, 30 won British Album of the Year at the 42nd Brit Awards, making Adele the first solo artist in history to win the honour three times. On 25 July, it was announced the Las Vegas residency will run from 18 November 2022 to 25 March 2023, with eight more dates than initially planned, for a total of 32 concerts. On 3 September, Adele received a Primetime Emmy Award for Outstanding Variety Special (Pre-Recorded) for her Grammy-nominated television special Adele One Night Only. Weekends with Adele received widespread critical acclaim, In their review, Billboard called the performance "utterly and breathlessly spectacular" adding: "It was remarkable to see a performer at her level be so present and take in all she had accomplished in arriving at this moment." The New York Times explained how Adele cried several times throughout the show and described the setup: "Adele’s stage is breathtaking, full of drama and elegance befitting her voice." In their four star review of the show, The Times said the performances were "spectacular, intimate and worth the wait".

Adele attended the 65th Annual Grammy Awards on February 2023, having received seven nominations. She took home the Grammy Award for Best Pop Solo Performance for Easy on Me, extending her record as the artist with the most wins in the category.

Artistry

Influences and favourite musicians

Adele has cited the Spice Girls as a major influence in regard to her love and passion for music, stating that "they made me what I am today". During childhood, she impersonated the Spice Girls at dinner parties. She says she was "heartbroken" when her favourite Spice Girls member, Geri Halliwell aka "Ginger Spice", departed from the group. Lauryn Hill is also one of her major influences. In a 2011 interview, Adele deemed Hill's record The Miseducation of Lauryn Hill as her favourite album, while also stating "I was analyzing the record for about a month at the age of 8, I was constantly wondering when I would be that passionate about something, to write a record about it, even though I didn't know I was going to make a record when I was older"; while also thanking Hill "for existing" in a penned letter, that she dedicated in honour of the 20th anniversary of Hill's album. Growing up she also listened to Sinéad O'Connor, the Cranberries, Bob Marley, the Cure, Dusty Springfield, Whitney Houston, Aretha Franklin, Celine Dion, Jeff Buckley, and Annie Lennox. Gabrielle was an early influence, whom Adele has admired since age five. During Adele's school years, her mother made her an eye patch with sequins which she used to perform as the Hackney-born star in a school talent contest.

After moving to south London, she became interested in R&B acts such as Aaliyah, Destiny's Child, Mary J. Blige, and Alicia Keys. Adele has stated that one of the most defining moments in her life was when she saw Pink perform at Brixton Academy in London. She says: "It was the Missundaztood record, so I was about 13 or 14. I had never heard, being in the room, someone sing like that live [...] I remember sort of feeling like I was in a wind tunnel, her voice just hitting me. It was incredible."

In 2002, 14-year-old Adele discovered Etta James and Ella Fitzgerald as she stumbled on the artists' CDs in the jazz section of her local music store. She was struck by their appearance on the album covers. Adele states she then "started listening to Etta James every night for an hour," and in the process was getting "to know my own voice." She has credited Amy Winehouse and her 2003 album Frank with inspiring her to take up the guitar, saying: "If it wasn't for Amy and Frank, one hundred per cent I wouldn't have picked up a guitar, I wouldn't have written 'Daydreamer' or 'Hometown [Glory]' and I wrote 'Someone Like You' on the guitar too."

She has also expressed admiration for Lana Del Rey, Grimes, Chvrches, FKA Twigs, Alabama Shakes, Kanye West, Rihanna, Britney Spears, Frank Ocean, Queen, and Stevie Nicks. In 2017, she described Beyoncé as a particular inspiration, calling her "[the] artist of my life" and added "the other artists who mean that much to me are all dead." Adele cited Madonna's 1998 album Ray of Light as a "chief inspiration" for her album 25. She stated that the release of 25 and her own comeback was inspired by the enigmatic Kate Bush who in 2014 made a comeback to the stage 35 years after her last live shows from her only tour in 1979. Adele mentioned that Max Martin's work on Taylor Swift's "I Knew You Were Trouble" was the inspiration behind her song "Send My Love (To Your New Lover)", saying: "I was like, 'Who did this?' I knew it was Taylor, and I've always loved her, but this is a totally other side – like, 'I want to know who brought that out in her.' I was unaware that I knew who Max Martin was. I Googled him, and I was like, 'He's literally written every massive soundtrack of my life.' So I got my management to reach out. They came to London, and I took my guitar along and was like, 'I've got this riff,' and then 'Send My Love' happened really quickly."

Musical style
Adele’s work encompasses soul genre with jazz and R&B included in between. Her debut album, 19, is of the soul genre, with lyrics addressing heartbreak and relationship. Her success occurred simultaneously with several other British female soul singers, with the British press dubbing her a new Amy Winehouse. This was described as a third British Musical Invasion of the US. However, Adele called the comparisons between her and other female soul singers lazy, noting "we're a gender, not a genre". AllMusic wrote that "Adele is simply too magical to compare her to anyone."

Her second album, 21, shares the folk and soul influences of her debut album, but was further inspired by American country and Southern blues music to which she had been exposed during her 2008–09 tour An Evening with Adele in North America. Conceived in the aftermath of Adele's breakup with a partner, the album typifies the near dormant tradition of the confessional singer-songwriter in its exploration of heartbreak, self-examination, and forgiveness. Having referred to 21 as a "break-up record", Adele labelled her third studio album, 25, a "make-up record", adding it is about "Making up for lost time. Making up for everything I ever did and never did." 30 is a collection of pop, soul, and jazz songs. Journalists have described it as Adele's most creative work sonically, expanding on her past works by incorporating dance-pop, gospel and jazz elements.

Voice
Adele is a mezzo-soprano, with a range spanning from B2 to C6. However Classic FM states she is often mistaken for a contralto due to the application of a tense chest mix to reach the lower notes, while also noting that her voice becomes its clearest as she ascends the register, particularly from C4 to C5. Rolling Stone reported that following throat surgery her voice had become "palpably bigger and purer-toned", and that she had added a further four notes to the top of her range. Initially, critics suggested that her vocals were more developed and intriguing than her songwriting, a sentiment with which Adele agreed. She has stated: "I taught myself how to sing by listening to Ella Fitzgerald for acrobatics and scales, Etta James for passion and Roberta Flack for control."

Adele's singing has received acclaim from music critics. In a review of 19, The Observer stated, "The way she stretched the vowels, her wonderful soulful phrasing, the sheer unadulterated pleasure of her voice, stood out all the more; little doubt that she's a rare singer". BBC Music wrote, "Her melodies exude warmth, her singing is occasionally stunning and, ...she has tracks that make Lily Allen and Kate Nash sound every bit as ordinary as they are." Also in 2008, Sylvia Patterson of The Guardian wrote, "Of all the gobby new girls, only Adele's bewitching singing voice has the enigmatic quality which causes tears of involuntary emotion to splash down your face in the way Eva Cassidy's did before her." For their reviews of 21, The New York Times chief music critic Jon Pareles commended Adele's emotive timbre, likening her to Dusty Springfield, Petula Clark, and Annie Lennox: "[Adele] can seethe, sob, rasp, swoop, lilt and belt, in ways that draw more attention to the song than to the singer". Ryan Reed of Paste magazine regarded her voice as "a raspy, aged-beyond-its-years thing of full-blooded beauty", while MSN Music's Tom Townshend called her "the finest singer of [our] generation". Adele has also been dubbed a "vocal goddess".

Personal life
In 2011, Adele began a relationship with charity entrepreneur Simon Konecki. Their son was born on 19 October 2012. On the topic of becoming a parent, Adele said she "felt like I was truly living. I had a purpose, where before I didn't". Adele and Konecki brought a privacy case against a UK-based photo agency that published intrusive paparazzi images of their son taken during family outings in 2013. Lawyers working on their behalf accepted damages from the company in July 2014. Adele has also opened up about suffering from postnatal depression, anxiety, and panic attacks.

In early 2017, tabloids started speculating that Adele and Konecki had secretly married when they were spotted wearing matching rings on their ring fingers. During her acceptance speech at the 59th Annual Grammy Awards for Album of the Year, Adele seemed to have confirmed these reports by referring to Konecki as "my husband" when thanking him. She repeated this in March 2017, telling the audience at a concert in Brisbane, Australia, "I'm married now". However, in a 2021 interview with British Vogue, she revealed that they actually married in 2018, and separated the same year. During this time, Adele became a stay-at-home mother. In April 2019, Adele's representatives confirmed the separation via Associated Press, and affirmed that she and Konecki would continue to raise their son together. On 13 September 2019, it was reported that Adele had filed for divorce from Konecki in the US. Their divorce was finalised on 4 March 2021. In 2021, Adele entered a relationship with American sports agent Rich Paul.

Politically, she is a supporter of the Labour Party, saying in 2011 that she was a "Labour girl through and through", and in the same interview was critical of the Conservative Party. Despite this declared political alignment, Adele received backlash for her comments on paying taxes during a 2011 interview with Q magazine. She said, "I use the NHS, I can't use public transport any more, doing what I do, I went to state school, I'm mortified to have to pay 50 percent! Trains are always late, most state schools are shit and I've gotta give you like four million quid, are you having a laugh? When I got my tax bill in from 19 I was ready to go and buy a gun and randomly open fire."

Born in the North London district of Tottenham, Adele supports local football club Tottenham Hotspur.

In 2015, Adele said, "I'm a feminist, I believe that everyone should be treated the same, including race and sexuality". Supportive of the LGBT community, on 12 June 2016, an emotional Adele dedicated her show in Antwerp, Belgium, to the victims of the mass shooting at a gay nightclub in Orlando, Florida, United States, earlier that day, adding, "The LGBTQ community, they're like my soul mates since I was really young, so I'm very moved by it."

In April 2018, it was widely reported that Adele had become an ordained minister in order to officiate at close friend comedian Alan Carr's wedding to Paul Drayton, something which Adele herself subsequently confirmed. The wedding, held in January 2018, took place in the garden of her house in Los Angeles, California. Adele's close friends include Nicole Richie, Jennifer Lawrence, Cameron Diaz, Emma Stone, Laura Dockrill, Lauren and Aaron Paul, James Corden, and Elton John, among others. Drake called Adele "One of [his] best friends in the world".

Wealth
In 2012, Adele topped the List of Richest Young Musicians under 30 in the UK, included on the Sunday Times Rich List. In July 2012, she was listed at number six in Forbes list of the world's highest-paid celebrities under the age of 30, having earned  million between May 2011 and May 2012. For six consecutive years, from 2013 to 2018, Adele topped the List of Richest Young Musicians under 30 in the UK and Ireland as part of the Sunday Times annual Rich List. In 2015, Adele said she declined all sorts of lucrative endorsement offers out of personal choice. In 2015, she reported paying £4 million tax in the UK. In July 2016, Adele was ranked number nine on the Forbes list of the 100 highest-paid celebrities in the world. In November 2016 and November 2017, she was in second place on the Forbes list of the world's highest-paid women in music, earning  million and $69 million, respectively. The Sunday Times Rich List valued her wealth at £125 million in 2017, and she was ranked the 19th UK's richest musician overall whilst being the only woman in the top 20. Adele owns and operates two companies, Melted Stone Ltd and Melted Stone Publishing. In 2017, she earned $11.2 million in royalties from record sales, after taxes, according to official documents from her companies, without any new album release at the time, and whilst spending her time off. On the 2019 Sunday Times Rich List, Adele was valued at £150 million (US$180.5 million) as the 22nd richest musician in the UK, despite not having toured since 2017.

In 2012, Adele and then-partner Konecki purchased a $3.4 million Art Deco villa in Portslade, on the outskirts of Brighton and Hove, which she sold for $3.7 million in 2016. That same year, she bought two houses built side-by-side in Kensington for $7.7 million and $7.3 million, respectively, with the intention of combining them. Adele also bought a home for her mother in West London for around $817,000. In 2013, she temporarily rented Paul McCartney's  former mansion for an undisclosed price. In 2015, Adele purchased a $5.2 million Mediterranean-style vacation mansion in Malibu, California, and sold it in 2017 for less than its original purchase price, $4.8 million. She envisioned buying several properties on the same street in a Beverly Hills gated community, beginning with the first home purchased for $9.5 million from Don Mischer in 2016. During her Madison Square Garden tour in September 2016, Adele rented NBA player Deron Williams' Tribeca apartment for three weeks at a monthly rent of $60,000. In 2017, she and Konecki purchased a $5.3 million Tudor mansion called Ridge Hill Manor, located in the English countryside on the outskirts of East Grinstead. In 2019 and 2021, Adele bought two more Beverly Hills mansions for $10.65 million and $10 million, respectively; the latter was purchased from Richie and her husband, Joel Madden. In February 2022, it was reported she bought Sylvester Stallone's  former mansion in Beverly Park, Los Angeles, for $58 million.

Philanthropy
Adele has performed in numerous charity concerts throughout her career. In 2007 and 2008, she performed at the Little Noise Sessions held at London's Union Chapel, with proceeds from the concerts donated to Mencap which works with people with learning disabilities. In July and November 2008, Adele performed at the Keep a Child Alive Black Ball in London and New York City respectively. On 17 September 2009, she performed at the Brooklyn Academy of Music, for the VH1 Divas event, a concert to raise money for the Save The Music Foundation charity. On 6 December, Adele opened with a 40-minute set at John Mayer's 2nd Annual Holiday Charity Revue held at the Nokia Theatre in Los Angeles. In 2011, Adele gave a free concert for Pride London, a registered charity which arranges LGBT events in London. The same year, Adele took part in the UK charity telethon Comic Relief for Red Nose Day 2011, performing "Someone like You".

Adele has been a major contributor to MusiCares, a charity organisation founded by the National Academy of Recording Arts and Sciences for musicians in need. In February 2009, Adele performed at the 2009 MusiCares charity concert in Los Angeles. In 2011 and 2012, Adele donated autographed items for auctions to support MusiCares. Adele required all backstage visitors to the North American leg of her Adele Live tour to donate a minimum charitable contribution of US$20 for the UK charity SANDS, an organisation dedicated to "supporting anyone affected by the death of a baby and promoting research to reduce the loss of babies' lives".

On 15 June 2017, Adele attended a vigil in west London for the victims of the Grenfell Tower fire where, keeping a low profile, she was only spotted by a handful of fans. Four days later she appeared at Chelsea fire station and brought cakes for the firefighters. Station manager Ben King stated "She came in, came up to the mess and had a cup of tea with the watch and then she joined us for the minute's silence." Paying tribute to the victims at her first Wembley show on 28 June, Adele encouraged fans to donate money to help the victims of the blaze rather than waste the money on "overpriced wine".

Impact 
The Seattle Post-Intelligencer has called her "Queen of Soul" for her early success as a soul singer-songwriter, while she was referred to as the "Queen of Hearts" by publications such as Vogue and Vanity Fair. In 2014, Adele was already being regarded as a British cultural icon, with young adults from abroad naming her among a group of people whom they most associated with UK culture, which included William Shakespeare, Queen Elizabeth II, David Beckham, J. K. Rowling, The Beatles, Charlie Chaplin and Elton John.

Richard Russell, the founder of record label XL Recordings, complimented Adele that she had the potential to change the way women were seen in the music industry by focusing on music rather than sexuality. The New Yorker called her "the most popular living soul singer in the world" at 27-years-old. Writing for Vulture, Jillian Mapes opined that Adele is "among the first plus-size female cultural icons to reach the highest echelons of commercial success without having to make herself the butt of fat jokes along the way". Time journalist Sam Lansky described her as "a voice for every generation" and further stated that "Adele bridges pop music's past and its future". Lansky wrote that Adele, by choosing to sound like the past, goes in an opposite direction in mainstream music when her contemporaries "try to sound simultaneously like each other" and follow trends.

Billboard credited Adele for reviving the music industry in 2011, the year of 21s release, and wrote: "She was a unique presence not only in 2011, but in all of 21st century pop: a preternaturally gifted singer and songwriter with a leave-it-all-on-the-floor approach to recording and performing — and also an earthy, relatable, and strangely unassuming personality both on and off the stage". Junkee and Consequence of Sound credited her for revitalizing pop music and heralding "a new era of relatable pop" due to the critical and commercial success of 21. In an article about how music from 2011 defined pop music, Junkee also credited Adele for reviving the breakup ballad music, paving the way for young artists like Olivia Rodrigo to utilize some elements of pop ballads that she did into their own music. In a 2021 article from The Daily Telegraph, James Hall wrote that "a new Adele album isn't just a release − it's a global cultural event". Rolling Stone writers observed that "She has written more modern pop standards than anyone else in her generation, each single becoming an instant classic."

Rolling Stone has listed her at 22nd in their list of 200 Greatest Singers of all time (2023) while The Times named her as 2nd best singer of the 21st century in their list of 20 best solo singers. Consequence of Sound ranked Adele at number 34 on its list of The 100 Greatest Singers of All Time, describing her voice as "athletic and authentic" and "an unapologetic powerhouse with a knack for tone and an ability to imbue her performances with genuine emotion". In 2019, Insider listed her among the top artists of the decade, and wrote: "Her artistry and style broke through in a time of ultra club-happy pop music, and paved the way for other artists to break the mold". In 2022, she has been ranked number 8 on Yardbarker's The Greatest Singing Voices of All Time list. Adele and her work have influenced numerous recording artists, including Beyoncé, Lauren Daigle, Billie Eilish, Rebecca Ferguson, Jess Glynne, Conan Gray, Freya Ridings, Sigrid, Sam Smith, Tom Walker and Lizzo.

Accolades and achievements

Adele has sold more than 170 million records worldwide with 70 million in album sales and over 100 million in single sales as of 2022, making her one of the world's best-selling music artists. She is one of the artists who bring the most revenue to the music industry per day.

At the 51st Annual Grammy Awards in 2009, 21-year-old Adele won awards in the categories of Best New Artist and Best Female Pop Vocal Performance. She was also nominated in the categories of Record of the Year and Song of the Year. The success of her debut album 19 saw Adele nominated for three Brit Awards in the categories of British Female Solo Artist, British Single of the Year and British Breakthrough Act. Then British Prime Minister Gordon Brown sent a thank-you letter to Adele that stated "with the troubles that the country's in financially, you're a light at the end of the tunnel".

Adele's second album, 21, earned her a record-tying six Grammy Awards, including Album of the Year; two Brit Awards, including British Album of the Year. Adele was the second artist and first female, preceded by Christopher Cross, to have won all four of the general field awards throughout her career. The success of the album saw her receive numerous mentions in the Guinness Book of World Records. With 21 non-consecutive weeks at number 1 in the US, Adele broke the record for the longest number-1 album by a woman in Billboard history, beating the record formerly held by Whitney Houston's soundtrack The Bodyguard. 21 spent its 23rd week at number one in March 2012, making it the longest-running album at number one since 1985, and it became the fourth-best-selling album of the past 10 years in the US. The best selling album in the UK of the 21st century, and the best selling album by a female in UK chart history, 21 is also the second-best-selling album in the UK of all time. 21 was her first album certified diamond in the US. On 6 March, 21 reached 30 non-consecutive weeks at number one on the Australian ARIA Chart, making it the longest-running number one album in Australia in the 21st century, and the second longest-running number one ever.

In May 2011, "Team Adele" was ranked number one on The Guardians "Music Power 100" list: "the 100 most influential people in the music industry". In February 2012, Adele was listed at number five on VH1's 100 Greatest Women in Music. In April 2012, Time magazine named Adele one of the 100 most influential people in the world. People named her one of 2012 Most Beautiful at Every Age. On 30 April 2012, a tribute to Adele was held at New York City's (Le) Poisson Rouge called Broadway Sings Adele, starring various Broadway actors such as Matt Doyle.

In the week ending 3 March 2012, Adele became the first solo female artist to have three singles in the top 10 of the Billboard Hot 100 at the same time with "Rolling in the Deep", "Someone Like You", and "Set Fire to the Rain" as well as the first female artist to have two albums in the top 5 of the Billboard 200 and two singles in the top 5 of the Billboard Hot 100 simultaneously. Adele topped the 2012 Sunday Times Rich List of musicians in the UK under 30, and made the Top 10 of Billboard magazine's "Top 40 Money Makers". Billboard also announced the same day that Adele's "Rolling in the Deep" is the biggest crossover hit of the past 25 years, topping pop, adult pop and adult contemporary charts and that Adele is one of four female artists to have an album chart at number one for more than 13 weeks (the other three artists being Judy Garland, Carole King, and Whitney Houston).

At the 2012 Ivor Novello Awards in May, Adele was named Songwriter of the Year, and "Rolling in the Deep" won the award for Most Performed Work of 2011. At the 2012 BMI Awards held in London in October, Adele won Song of the Year (for "Rolling in the Deep") in recognition of the song being the most played on US television and radio in 2011. In 2013, Adele won the Academy Award for Best Original Song for the James Bond theme "Skyfall". This is the first James Bond song to win and the fifth to be nominated—after "For Your Eyes Only" (1981), "Nobody Does It Better" (1977), "Live and Let Die" (1973), and "The Look of Love" (1967). "Skyfall" won the Brit Award for Best British Single at the 33rd Brit Awards.

In June 2013, Adele was appointed a MBE in the Queen's Birthday Honours list for services to music, and she received the award from Prince Charles at Buckingham Palace on 19 December 2013. In February 2013 she was named one of the 100 most powerful women in the UK by Woman's Hour on BBC Radio 4.

Released in 2015, Adele's third album, 25, became the year's best-selling album and broke first week sales records in a number of markets, including the UK and the US. 25 was her second album to be certified diamond in the US and earned her five Grammy Awards, including her second Grammy Award for Album of the Year, and four Brit Awards, including her second Brit Award for British Album. Adele became the only artist in history to, on two separate occasions, win the three general categories Grammys in the same ceremony. With 15 awards from 18 nominations, Adele won more Grammys than any other female who was born outside the US. Adele's seven weeks at the top of the UK Albums Chart took her total to 31 weeks at number one in the UK with her three albums, surpassing Madonna's previous record of most weeks at number one for a female act in the UK. The lead single, "Hello", became the first song in the US to sell over one million digital copies within a week of its release.

At the 2016 Ivor Novello Awards Adele was named Songwriter of the Year for the second time by the British Academy of Songwriters, Composers, and Authors. In April 2016 she appeared for the second time on the Time 100 list of the world's most influential people. Adele was inducted into the Royal Albert Hall's Walk of Fame in 2018, making her one of the first eleven recipients of a star on the walk. Despite releasing just two albums in the decade (21 and 25), at 36 weeks she had the second most weeks at number one in the UK Album Charts in the 2010s, five weeks behind Ed Sheeran (who released four albums). In December 2019, Israel's largest TV and radio stations named her singer of the 2010s.

In 2021, Adele was named the UK's best-selling female album artist of the 21st century, based on Official Charts Company data. In May 2022, Time magazine named her for the third time among the 100 most influential people in the world in the "icons" category. As Adele has won Emmy, Grammy, and Oscar Awards, it makes her a Tony Award away from achieving EGOT status as of 2022.

Discography

 19 (2008)
 21 (2011)
 25 (2015)
 30 (2021)

Filmography

Concert tours and residencies

Headlining concerts 
 An Evening with Adele (2008–2009)
 Adele Live (2011)
 Adele Live 2016 (2016–2017)

Residency 
 Weekends with Adele (2022–2023)

See also

 List of best-selling music artists – Artists with sales of over 120 million records worldwide
 List of British Grammy winners and nominees
 List of one-word stage names
 Honorific nicknames in popular music
 List of Billboard Social 50 number-one artists
 List of artists who reached number one in the United States
 Best-selling female artists of all time
 List of most-streamed artists on Spotify

Mentioning in TV
In The Simpsons' episode Treehouse of Horror XXIX, Lisa Simpson goes crazy and kidnaps Bart Simpson, Milhouse van Houten and  Nelson Muntz and lures them into an abandoned recycling hall. She threats them with a rough and raspy voice "Time to recycle, you stupid boys!", whereupon Milhouse warns her "Careful, Lisa! If you keeping yelling like that, you'll get polypes on your vocal cords like Adele!".

References

Sources and bibliography

External links

  – official site
 
 
 
 Adele at Grammys
 

 
1988 births
21st-century English singers
21st-century English women singers
APRA Award winners
Ballad musicians
Best Original Song Academy Award-winning songwriters
Brit Award winners
British contemporary R&B singers
BT Digital Music Awards winners
Columbia Records artists
Echo (music award) winners
English activists
English feminists
English guitarists
English mezzo-sopranos
English people of Welsh descent
English pop singers
English soul singers
English women activists
English women guitarists
English women pop singers
English women singer-songwriters
Feminist musicians
Golden Globe Award-winning musicians
Grammy Award winners
HIV/AIDS activists
Ivor Novello Award winners
Juno Award for International Album of the Year winners
Labour Party (UK) people
English LGBT rights activists
Living people
Members of the Order of the British Empire
MTV Europe Music Award winners
Neo soul singers
NME Awards winners
People educated at the BRIT School
People from Tottenham
Primetime Emmy Award winners
Shorty Award winners
Singers from London
Third British Invasion artists
Torch singers
XL Recordings artists